Karas may refer to:

Places
 Karas Region, Namibia
 Karaš River, a river in Serbia and Romania (Romanian Caraş)
 Karas Island, an island in Sebakor Bay, West Papua, Indonesia
 Karaś, Kuyavian-Pomeranian Voivodeship, a village in north-central Poland
 Karaś, Warmian-Masurian Voivodeship, a village in north Poland
 Karaś Lake, a lake in north-east Poland

People
 Karas (surname)
 Saint Karas
 Bishop Karas (1955–2002), bishop of the Coptic Orthodox Church in the United States

Other uses
 Karas language
 Karas (anime) by Sato Keiichi
 PZL.23 Karaś, a mid-1930s Polish light bomber and reconnaissance aircraft
 Karas (food)

See also
 
Caras (disambiguation)
Karis (disambiguation)